is a retired Japanese judoka.

Ishikawa was born in Akabori, Gunma and began judo at the age of 12. She entered The Asahi Bank, Ltd after graduating from Saitama University in 1994.  She excelled at Seoi nage and Ippon seoi nage.

She won the medals in the Asian Championships in 1988 and 1991. In 1997, Ishikawa participated in the World Championships held in Paris but was defeated by Séverine Vandenhende in the second round and Jung Sung-Sook in the consolation round. She retired after the Championships.

Ishikawa had coached judo at the Shukutoku Junior Highschool from 1996 to 2005. As of 2010, she don't have a relation with judo and lives in Ichihara, Chiba with her family.

Achievements
1988 - Asian Championships (-61 kg) 2nd
 - Kodokan Cup (-61 kg) 1st
 - All-Japan High School Championships (-61 kg) 1st
1989 - All-Japan Selected Championships (-61 kg) 3rd
 - All-Japan High School Championships (-61 kg) 1st
1990 - Kodokan Cup (-61 kg) 1st
1991 - Asian Championships (-61 kg) 2nd
 - Fukuoka International Women's Championships (-61 kg) 1st
 - All-Japan Selected Championships (-61 kg) 2nd
 - All-Japan University Championships (-61 kg) 1st
1992 - Fukuoka International Women's Championships (-61 kg) 2nd
 - All-Japan University Championships (-61 kg) 2nd
1993 - East Asian Games (-61 kg) 2nd
 - Fukuoka International Women's Championships (-61 kg) 3rd
 - All-Japan Selected Championships (-61 kg) 1st
 - All-Japan University Championships (-61 kg) 1st
1994 - All-Japan Selected Championships (-61 kg) 2nd
 - All-Japan Businessgroup Championships (-61 kg) 2nd
1995 - Fukuoka International Women's Championships (-61 kg) 3rd
 - Kodokan Cup (-61 kg) 1st
 - All-Japan Selected Championships (-61 kg) 3rd
 - All-Japan Businessgroup Championships (-61 kg) 3rd
1996 - Fukuoka International Women's Championships (-61 kg) 3rd
 - Kodokan Cup (-61 kg) 1st
 - All-Japan Selected Championships (-61 kg) 2nd
1997 - World Championships (-61 kg) 7th
 - Tournoi Super World Cup Paris (-61 kg) 1st
 - All-Japan Selected Championships (-61 kg) 2nd

References

Japanese female judoka
People from Gunma Prefecture
1971 births
Living people